Pak Song-chol or Park Sung-chul (2 September 1913 – 28 October 2008) was a North Korean politician who served as Premier of North Korea from 1976 to 1977. He succeeded Kim Il. He also served as foreign minister from 1959 to 1970.

Biography
Born in Keishū, Keishō-hoku Prefecture (today North Gyeongsang Province) during the Japanese colonial period. Dropped out of Sophia University in Japan. While studying abroad, he joined the Japanese Communist Party. Participated in Anti-Japan Partisan in Manchukuo in April 1934. In 1936, youth member of the 1st corps of the 5th Army of the Tohoku Anti-Japanese Union. During the period, he was described as an extremely loyal and courageous youth member. In 1937, the second army 4th teacher 1st group. 1942, 1st platoon, 1st battalion, 1st battalion, 88th independent sniper brigade where he met Kim Il-sung.

In the spring of 1942, as a Soviet military reconnaissance officer, he was given the task of following the deployment situation of Japanese troops at the border. It should be a mission that ends in a week, but he did not return until autumn, during which he sent important information over radio signals.

North Korea
In 1948 Chief of Staff of the 3rd Division of the Korean People's Army (Colonel) . In 1950, he became the 15th division Commander and participated in the Korean War. In  September 1953 he was appointed Director of the Ministry of National Guard and Scouting. After that, he moved to the Ministry of Foreign Affairs, and from August 1954, he served as envoy to the People's Republic of Bulgaria, and in May 1955 the ambassador. August 1956, International Director of the Central Committee of the Workers' Party of Korea, Deputy Foreign Minister since October of the same year, and Foreign Minister in October 1959, until he retired in July 1970. During this time, in 1966 he also served as the Deputy Premier in the Cabinet of North Korea.

In 1972, as deputy premier, he secretly visited Seoul in the lead-up to the Joint Statement on reunification.

He was appointed as Vice President by the Supreme People's Assembly in December 1977 and he left the office in October 1997. His last public appearance was in September 2003 in the viewing box at the 55th-anniversary commemoration inspection ceremonies in North Korea. He was one of the oldest former heads of government in the world.

Death and funeral
Pak died on 28 October 2008. A funeral committee was appointed with Kim Yong-nam as the chairman. Its members were:

 Kim Yong-nam
 Jo Myong-rok
 Kim Yong-il
 Kim Yong-chun
 Ri Yong-mu
 Kim Kyok-sik
 Kim Il-chol
 Jon Pyong-ho
 Choe Thae-bok
 Yang Hyong-sop
 Kim Kuk-thae
 Kim Jung-rin
 Kim Ki-nam
 Choe Yong-rim
 Kim Jong-gak
 Kwak Pom-gi
 Ro Tu-chol
 Jon Sung-hun
 Thae Jong-su
 Kim Yong-dae
 Ryu Mi-yong
 Kim Yong-ju
 Ri Ul-sol
 Kim Chol-man
 Kim Ik-hyon
 Ri Jong-san
 Pak Ki-so
 Ri Ha-il
 Jon Jae-son
 Kang Yong-sop
 Hong Sok-hyong
 Ri Kwang-ho
 Kang Chang-uk
 Pyon Yong-rip
 Thae Hyong-chol
 Jang Song-thaek
 Pak Nam-gi
 Kim Song-kyu
 Kim Yang-kon
 Kang Kwan-chu
 O Kuk-ryol
 Choe Hui-jong
 Ju Sang-song
 Jong Thae-kun
 Jong Chang-ryol
 Pak Jae-gyong
 Kim Sang-ik
 Kim Thaek-ku
 Yun Jong-rin
 Kim Yang-chom
 Pak Ui-chun
 Ri Kil-song
 Kim Pyong-ryul
 Ri Yong-chol
 Kim Pyong-pal
 Ro Song-sil
 Kim Yong-ho
 Jon Kil-su
 Ra Tong-hui
 Ri Kyong-sik
 Ri Chu-o
 Ri Ryong-nam
 Kim Pong-chol
 Kim Yong-jin
 Mun Jae-chol

Works

See also
Politics of North Korea

References

External links
Obituary in the Korea Times

1913 births
2008 deaths
Vice presidents of North Korea
Korean independence activists
Korean communists
North Korean atheists
Prime Ministers of North Korea
Foreign ministers of North Korea
National Heroes of North Korea
Members of the 6th Politburo of the Workers' Party of Korea
Members of the 6th Central Committee of the Workers' Party of Korea
People of 88th Separate Rifle Brigade